Sułków may refer to:
Sułków, Lower Silesian Voivodeship (south-west Poland)
Sułków, Lesser Poland Voivodeship (south Poland)
Sułków, Masovian Voivodeship (east-central Poland)
Sułków, Opole Voivodeship (south-west Poland)
Sułków, Końskie County in Świętokrzyskie Voivodeship (south-central Poland)
Sułków, Włoszczowa County in Świętokrzyskie Voivodeship (south-central Poland)

See also
Sułkowo (disambiguation)
Sułkówek